
AD 27 (XXVII) was a common year starting on Wednesday (link will display the full calendar) of the Julian calendar. At the time, it was known as the Year of the Consulship of Piso and Frugi (or, less frequently, year 780 Ab urbe condita). The denomination AD 27 for this year has been used since the early medieval period, when the Anno Domini calendar era became the prevalent method in Europe for naming years.

Events

By place

Roman Empire 
 Fire in Rome. 
 A poorly built amphitheatre in Fidenae collapses, killing 20,000 of the 50,000 spectators.
 Using the dates and ranges listed in the Gospel of Luke, this year can be established as when John the Baptist begins preaching in the Jordan. It is also likely that Jesus was baptised by John in the final months of this year before his temptation and the first of three Passovers listed in the Gospel of John.
 An Arc of Triumph is erected in Rimini, in honor of the former Emperor Augustus.

By topic

Religion 
 Christianity is born, as a Jewish sect in Jerusalem.

Births 
 Herod Agrippa II, king of Judea 
 Petronius, Roman writer and suffect consul (d. AD 66)
 Wang Chong, Chinese astronomer and philosopher (d. AD 100)

Deaths 
 Publius Quinctilius Varus the Younger, Roman nobleman (b. AD 4)

References 

0027

als:20er#27